William Grimes may refer to:

 William Alvan Grimes (1911–1999), Chief Justice of the New Hampshire Supreme Court
 William C. Grimes (1857–1931), American politician and businessman
 William Grimes (journalist) (born 1959), former restaurant critic and current obituary writer for The New York Times
 W. F. Grimes (1905–1988), Welsh archaeologist
 William Grimes (footballer) (1886–?), English professional footballer for Bradford City and Derby County
 William Grimes (ex-slave) (1784–1865), author of what is considered the first narrative of an American ex-slave, Life of William Grimes, the Runaway Slave
 William P. Grimes (1868–1939),  American politician in Wisconsin

See also
 Billy Grimes (1927–2005), American football player
Willie Grimes (disambiguation)